Spirotropis confusa is a species of sea snail, a marine gastropod mollusk in the family Drilliidae.

Subspecies
 Spirotropis confusa confusa (Seguenza, 1880)
 Spirotropis confusa sarsi Warén, 1975

Description
The length of the shell attains 16 mm.

Distribution
This species occurs in the demersal zone of the Mediterranean Sea

References

 Warén A. (1975). Spirotropis sarsi, new name for Spirotropis carinata Sars, 1878 (Gastropoda: Prosobranchia). Sarsia 59: 49-52
]

External links
 Seguenza, G. (1880). Le formazioni terziarie nella provincia di Reggio (Calabria). Memorie della Classe di Scienze Fisiche Matematiche e Naturali della Regia Accademia del Lincei. 3(6):1–445
  Sars, M. (1859). Bidrag til en skildring af den arktiske molluskfauna ved Norges nordlige kyst. Forhandlinger i Videnskabs-Selskabet i Christiania. (1858): 34-8
 Bivona-Bernardi And. (1838). Generi et specie di molluschi descritti dal Barone Antonio Bivona e Bernardi. Lavori postumi pubblicati dal figlio Andrea dottore in medicina con note ed aggiunte. Giornale di Scienze Lettere e Arti per la Sicilia. 61: 211-227 [stated date March 1838; 63: 319-324]
 [http://www.repository.naturalis.nl/document/148594 Janssen, R. 1993. Taxonomy, evolution and spreading of the turrid genus Spirotropis (Gastropoda: Turridae). Scripta Geologica Special Issue 2:237–261, 2 figs., 5 pls
 Gofas, S.; Luque, Á. A.; Templado, J.; Salas, C. (2017). A national checklist of marine Mollusca in Spanish waters. Scientia Marina. 81(2) : 241-254, and supplementary online material.
 
 Sars, M. (1859). Bidrag til en skildring av den arctiske molluskfauna ved Norges nordlige kyst. Forhandlinger i Videnskabsselskabet i Kristiania. (1858): 34–87

confusa
Gastropods described in 1880